MV Höegh Osaka is a roll-on/roll-off car carrier ship that was built in 2000 as Maersk Wind for A P Møller, Singapore. She was sold to Höegh Autoliners (Leif Höegh & Co) in 2008 and later renamed Höegh Osaka in August 2011. On 3 January 2015 she developed a severe list and was intentionally grounded in the Solent. Her 24 crew and a pilot were subsequently rescued.

Construction

The ship has a capacity of 2,520 cars or 450 lorries.

History
The ship was built in 2000 at yard number 1161 by Tsuneishi Holdings Corporation, Tadotsu District, Kagawa, Japan. The keel was laid on 3 December 1999 and the ship was launched as Maersk Wind on 1 May 2000 initially under AP Møller, Singapore management. Management was transferred to AP Møller-Maersk, Copenhagen, Denmark later in 2000. Management was transferred back in 2007. In 2008, the ship was sold to Höegh Autocarriers and renamed Höegh Osaka.

The port of registry is Singapore. It has IMO number 9185463 and MMSI number 563248000, and call sign is S6TY. Höegh Osaka is owned by Höegh Autoliners and operated under the management of Wallem Shipmanagement, Singapore.

January 2015 grounding

On 3 January 2015 Höegh Osaka was loaded at Southampton, Hampshire, United Kingdom with a ro-ro cargo of buses, construction equipment and Range Rover cars in addition to some unspecified cargo already on board. More cargo was to be loaded at Bremerhaven, Germany, its next stop and then at Hamburg, Germany for more cargo and refuelling. This was a change from the normal route of Hamburg, Bremerhaven and then Southampton.

A pilot embarked at 19:30 and the ship departed at 20:06. At 21:09, Höegh Osaka made a port turn at the West Bramble Buoy and developed a severe list. The pilot gave the order to stop engines at 21:10, and expressed doubts in respect of the metacentric height (GM) of the vessel. As the list increased, the ship's propeller and rudder came clear of the water. The ship grounded on the Bramble Bank off the Isle of Wight at 21:15, and settled with a list that would eventually reach 52°. According to the owners they beached the vessel intentionally on the Bramble Bank in the Solent.

At 21:19 the D-class inshore lifeboat from Calshot Lifeboat Station was called out. The tugs Svitzer Ferriby and Svitzer Surrey, in Southampton Water at the time, were also sent to the assistance of Höegh Osaka. A Severn-class lifeboat from Yarmouth and an Atlantic 85-class lifeboat from Cowes, Isle of Wight were called out. The second Calshot Lifeboat was then called out. A Coastguard AgustaWestland AW139 helicopter from RNAS Lee-on-Solent (HMS Daedalus) was called out and the tug Apex was also sent to assist.

At 21:54, Svitzer Ferriby arrived at the Bramble Bank and assisted in beaching the ship. A crew member jumped into the water as a lifeboat approached and was rescued. Six crew were winched aboard the helicopter from Lee-on-the-Solent and landed there.  assisted in the coordination of the rescue efforts. A crew member from the Yarmouth Lifeboat was winched onto Höegh Osaka to assist with the evacuation. A Royal Air Force  Westland Sea King helicopter was called out from RAF Chivenor. The National Police Air Service also sent a helicopter equipped with night vision equipment. All crew except pilot, captain and chief officer had been rescued by 00:15 on 4 January. All were evacuated at 02:09 because the vessel's list was increasing as the tide fell.

The ship was carrying a cargo of 1,400 vehicles and about 70 pieces of construction equipment. Svitzer were appointed as salvers. A  maritime exclusion zone was set up around the ship, and airspace below  closed to aircraft within . An attempt to refloat the ship was scheduled for 7 January, but cancelled because more water than expected was discovered inside the vessel. On 22 January, Höegh Osaka was towed in to Southampton, salvage operations having reduced the list to 5°.

Return to service
On 10 February, Höegh Osaka departed from Southampton for Falmouth, Cornwall to be repaired. The ship returned to service on 20 February 2015, sailing from Falmouth via Gibraltar into the Mediterranean Sea headed for Bar, Montenegro.

Investigation
The Marine Accident Investigation Branch opened an investigation into the accident. Its report into the incident was published on 17 March 2016.

The investigation found that plans for the loading of the cargo had not been changed despite the change in itinerary. No calculation of the vessel's stability had been made, a practice found to be common across many operators' fleets. The weight of cargo on board had been underestimated, being 265 tonnes greater than estimated. The investigation found that although the cargo had shifted as a result of the ship listing, it was not the cause of the list. The ship's ballast water system was not fully serviceable, all but one of the gauges for each ballast tank were unserviceable, a situation that had existed since at least July 2014. It was possible to take manual readings of the amount of water in each ballast tank. The chief officer was in the habit of calculating how much water was transferred between tanks by timing the pumps and using their capacity of 7 tonnes per minute. Some of the straps used to secure the cargo to the deck were found not to meet regulations in force at the time, only being half as strong as they should have been.

See also
List of roll-on/roll-off vessel accidents
, a car carrier which had a major list incident in 2006.
, a car carrier which capsized off Oporto in 1988.

References

External links

2000 ships
Ro-ro ships
Ships built in Japan
Merchant ships of Singapore
Maritime incidents in 2015
Shipwrecks in the Solent
2015 in England
Maritime incidents in England